Armand Dorian is an American doctor and medical consultant. He is most well-known for his role on Deadliest Warrior.

Education
Dorian was born and raised in Los Angeles, California. Dorian graduated with a major in biology with an emphasis in philosophy from UCLA. He received his MD from the John A. Burns School of Medicine, University of Hawaii. He continued residency training at the UCLA Emergency Medicine Residency Program. He then graduated from the USC Marshall School of Business with a Masters in Medical Management.

Career
He has performed research and published in human genomics and tropical biology. In 2000, upon graduation and receipt of his Board Certification, he joined the staff at both UCLA/Westwood and UCLA/Olive View hospitals and became a fellow of the American College of Emergency Physicians. In January 2015, he became the Director of the Emergency Department at Verdugo Hills Hospital and later was appointed to the position of Chief of Development and Treasurer. In 2018, he was appointed the Chief Medical Officer of USC Verdugo Hills Hospital. In 2021, March 12, he was appointed the Chief Executive Officer of USC Verdugo Hills Hospital.  

Dorian is a recurring guest host on NBC's Extra. He is also regular guest on medical shows Dr. Oz and The Doctors. Dorian worked as the medical consultant for Grey's Anatomy, Days of Our Lives, ER, Hawthorne as well as Heartbreaker.

Personal life 
Dorian is married to Aslin Dorian. The couple have three children.

References

External links

Year of birth missing (living people)
Living people
University of California, Los Angeles alumni
John A. Burns School of Medicine alumni
American hospital administrators
American television personalities
American people of Armenian descent
American emergency physicians